Dublin Artane was a parliamentary constituency represented in Dáil Éireann, the lower house of the Irish parliament or Oireachtas from 1977 to 1981. The constituency elected 3 deputies (Teachtaí Dála, commonly known as TDs) to the Dáil, using proportional representation by means of the single transferable vote (PR-STV).

History
The constituency was created under the terms of the Electoral (Amendment) Act 1974, largely replacing the former Dublin North-East constituency, as part of the redistribution of constituencies which attempted to secure the re-election of the outgoing Fine Gael–Labour Party government. It was only used for the 1977 general election. The constituency was abolished in 1981 with much of it going into an expanded Dublin North-Central constituency. There were 15 electoral areas in Dublin Artane; 11 went to Dublin North-Central for the 1981 general election, with two going to Dublin North-East and two to Dublin North-West.

Boundaries
It covered the north eastern parts of Dublin city, including the Artane area together with parts of Clontarf, Drumcondra and Santry. It consisted of the following wards of the county borough of Dublin: Artane A, Artane B, Artane C, Artane D, Artane E, Artane F, Artane G, Artane H, Clontarf East E, Clontarf West A, Clontarf West B, Drumcondra North A, Drumcondra North B, Drumcondra North C, Santry B.

TDs

1977 general election

See also 
Dáil constituencies
Politics of the Republic of Ireland
Historic Dáil constituencies
Elections in the Republic of Ireland

References

External links 
Oireachtas Members Database

Dáil constituencies in County Dublin (historic)
Artane, Dublin
1977 establishments in Ireland
1981 disestablishments in Ireland
Constituencies established in 1977
Constituencies disestablished in 1981